Sundby may refer to:


Places

Denmark
 Sundby, Copenhagen, a district in Copenhagen
 Sundby, Lolland, a satellite town of Nykøbing Falster on Lolland
 Nørresundby, a town on North Jutlandic Island

Sweden
 Sundby, Sweden, a locality on Ekerö in Stockholm County
 Sundbyberg Municipality, Sweden

People with the surname
 Martin Johnsrud Sundby, Norwegian cross-country skier
 Ragnhild Sundby (1922–2006), Norwegian zoologist